Masira Surin (born 18 November 1981) is a member of the India women's national field hockey team. She played with the team when it won the gold at the Manchester 2002 Commonwealth Games.

References 
Biography
Commonwealth Games Biography

Munda people
1981 births
Living people
People from Simdega district
Field hockey players from Jharkhand
Indian female field hockey players
Field hockey players at the 2002 Commonwealth Games
Field hockey players at the 2006 Commonwealth Games
Commonwealth Games medallists in field hockey
Commonwealth Games gold medallists for India
Commonwealth Games silver medallists for India
Field hockey players at the 2002 Asian Games
Sportswomen from Jharkhand
21st-century Indian women
21st-century Indian people
Asian Games competitors for India
Medallists at the 2002 Commonwealth Games
Medallists at the 2006 Commonwealth Games